The 2021 season was the Dallas Cowboys' 62nd season in the National Football League, their 33rd under the ownership of Jerry Jones, and their 13th playing home games at AT&T Stadium.

For the first time since 2004, long-time long snapper L. P. Ladouceur was not on the opening day roster, as he was not re-signed during free agency. This was also the first time since 2010 that long-time punter Chris Jones was not on the opening day roster, as he was released on March 17, 2021. To further add to the notable departures, for the first time since 2011, defensive lineman Tyrone Crawford was not on the opening day roster, as he announced his retirement on March 25, 2021. Additionally, for the first time since 2009, linebacker Sean Lee was not on the opening day roster, as he announced his retirement on April 26, 2021.

With their Week 10 win against the Atlanta Falcons, the Cowboys improved on their 6–10 record from the previous season. With their Week 14 win against the Washington Football Team, the Cowboys clinched their first winning season since 2018, and with the San Francisco 49ers' Week 16 loss to the Tennessee Titans, the Cowboys clinched their first playoff berth also since 2018. Following a Denver Broncos' loss to the Las Vegas Raiders, the Cowboys clinched the NFC East, based on strength-of-victory tiebreakers; this was their first division title since 2018. They swept the NFC East for the first time since 1998. The Cowboys' strong offense finished the year with 530 points, the most in the league, and a team record. But despite high expectations, the Cowboys lost in the wild card round of the playoffs to the San Francisco 49ers. The Cowboys scored 20 or more points in all but two of their regular season games. 

On July 2, 2021, the Cowboys were announced to be featured on HBO's Hard Knocks for the third time in franchise history.

Offseason

Signings

Re-signings

Departures

Draft

Notes
The Cowboys were awarded one third-round, one fourth-round, one fifth-round and one sixth-round compensatory picks (99th, 138th, 178th and 227th overall).
The Cowboys traded its first-round selection (10th overall) to Philadelphia in exchange for first- and third-round selections (12th and 84th overall).

Staff

Rosters

Opening preseason roster

Week one roster

Final roster

Preseason
On February 15, the NFL announced that the Cowboys would face the Pittsburgh Steelers in the Pro Football Hall of Fame Game on Thursday, August 5, at Tom Benson Hall of Fame Stadium in Canton, Ohio. The game kicked off at 7:00 p.m. CDT, and was televised by Fox. The Cowboys were represented by head coach Jimmy Johnson and safety Cliff Harris. The Cowboys and Steelers were scheduled to play in the 2020 Hall of Fame game; however, the game, the annual Hall of Fame enshrinement, along with the entire 2020 preseason, were cancelled due to the COVID-19 pandemic, and the Hall of Fame game between the Cowboys and Steelers was rescheduled for 2021.

The remainder of the Cowboys' preseason opponents are listed below; the schedule was announced on May 13.

Regular season

Schedule
The Cowboys' 2021 schedule was announced on May 12.

Note: Intra-division opponents are in bold text.

Game summaries

Week 1: at Tampa Bay Buccaneers
{{Americanfootballbox
|titlestyle=;text-align:center;
|state=autocollapse
|title=Week 1: Dallas Cowboys at Tampa Bay Buccaneers – Game summary
|date=
|time=8:20 p.m. EDT/7:20 p.m. CDT
|road=Cowboys
|R1=7|R2=9|R3=10|R4=3
|home=Buccaneers
|H1=7|H2=14|H3=7|H4=3
|stadium=Raymond James Stadium, Tampa, Florida
|attendance=65,566
|weather=Cloudy, 
|referee=Shawn Hochuli 
|TV=NBC/Peacock
|TVAnnouncers=Al Michaels, Cris Collinsworth, Michele Tafoya and Terry McAulay
|reference=Recap, Game Book
|scoring=
First quarter
 TB – Chris Godwin 5-yard pass from Tom Brady (Ryan Succop kick), 5:23. Buccaneers 7–0. Drive: 9 plays, 94 yards, 4:09
 DAL – CeeDee Lamb 22-yard pass from Dak Prescott (Greg Zuerlein kick), 1:35. Tied 7–7. Drive: 7 plays, 75 yards, 3:48
Second quarter
 TB – Rob Gronkowski 2-yard pass from Tom Brady (Ryan Succop kick), 9:48. Buccaneers 14–7. Drive: 6 plays, 50 yards, 2:53
 DAL – Amari Cooper 5-yard pass from Dak Prescott (kick failed), 4:12. Buccaneers 14–13. Drive: 5 plays, 27 yards, 2:08
 DAL – Greg Zuerlein 35-yard field goal, 3:16. Cowboys 16–14. Drive: 4 plays, 4 yards, 0:52
 TB – Antonio Brown 47-yard pass from Tom Brady (Ryan Succop kick), 2:38. Buccaneers 21–16. Drive: 2 plays, 57 yards, 0:38
Third quarter
 DAL – Greg Zuerlein 21-yard field goal, 9:15. Buccaneers 21–19. Drive: 13 plays, 72 yards, 5:45
 TB – Rob Gronkowski 11-yard pass from Tom Brady (Ryan Succop kick), 6:23. Buccaneers 28–19. Drive: 4 plays, 35 yards, 2:08
 DAL – Amari Cooper 21-yard pass from Dak Prescott (Greg Zuerlein kick), 0:33. Buccaneers 28–26. Drive: 10 plays, 75 yards, 5:50
Fourth quarter
 DAL – Greg Zuerlein 48-yard field goal, 1:29. Cowboys 29–28. Drive: 11 plays, 60 yards, 3:28
 TB – Ryan Succop 36-yard field goal, 0:02. Buccaneers 31–29. Drive: 11 plays, 57 yards, 1:22
|stats=
Top passers
 DAL – Dak Prescott – 42/58, 403 yards, 3 TD, INT
 TB – Tom Brady – 32/50, 379 yards, 4 TD, 2 INT
Top rushers
 DAL – Ezekiel Elliott – 11 rushes, 33 yards
 TB – Leonard Fournette – 9 rushes, 32 yards
Top receivers
 DAL – Amari Cooper – 13 receptions, 139 yards, 2 TD
 TB – Antonio Brown – 5 receptions, 121 yards, TD
}}
Dak Prescott played his first game since he suffered compound fracture and dislocation injuries to his right ankle during a Week 5 game against the Giants the previous season. The Cowboys defense forced four turnovers but Greg Zuerlein missed crucial field goals, including a 60-yarder and an extra point. The Cowboys would fall to 0–1. This was the only time this season that the Cowboys had a lead at one point but ended up losing the game.

Week 2: at Los Angeles Chargers

The Cowboys started the game with a 14–3 lead, from touchdown runs by Tony Pollard and Ezekiel Elliott. The Chargers later tied the game. The Cowboys and Chargers each scored a field goal in their next scoring drives. In the last seconds of the game, the Cowboys marched down the field to the Chargers' 38-yard line. Greg Zuerlein kicked a 56-yard field goal as time expired to give Dallas a crucial win. The win improved the Cowboys to 1–1. This was the Cowboys' first win over the Chargers since 2005.

Week 3: vs. Philadelphia Eagles

The Cowboys continued their home streak against the Eagles. Despite Dak Prescott's early hiccup by fumbling to allow the Eagles to score, Prescott responded by leading his team to torch the Eagles defense. Trevon Diggs recorded a pick-six off Jalen Hurts to tighten the Cowboys' lead. It was the first time since Week 8 of 2017 that the Cowboys recorded a pick-six. With the win, the Cowboys improved to 2–1.

Week 4: vs. Carolina Panthers

The Cowboys continued to roll. The Cowboys trailed 14–13 at halftime, but things significantly turned around for them in the second half. The third quarter began with Panthers' kicker Zane Gonzalez missing a field goal try, which the Cowboys took advantage by marching down the field to score a touchdown on the next drive. The Cowboys scored 23 unanswered points to take a 36–14 lead. Trevon Diggs recorded two interceptions off Panthers' Sam Darnold, giving Diggs a recorded 5 interceptions in the first 4 games. The Panthers scored the final 14 points, but the Cowboys picked up a first down in the last minutes to run out the clock. This win improved the Cowboys to 3–1. This was the Cowboys' first win over the Panthers since 2012.

Week 5: vs. New York Giants

Dak Prescott and the Cowboys played their second consecutive Week 5 home game against the Giants. Unlike the previous season's matchup, Dak Prescott finished the game without suffering an injury. The game began with Dak Prescott throwing an interception and losing a fumble, neither turnover of which the Cowboys would allow the Giants to score. The Cowboys never once trailed despite allowing New York to tie the game. After this, the game was all Dallas. The Cowboys scored two more takeaways, one of which was a pick six collected by Anthony Brown to seal the win for the Cowboys. This win improved the Cowboys to 4–1. This was the first time since 2018 that they won 4 or more consecutive games.

Week 6: at New England Patriots

The Cowboys scored the 2,500th touchdown in franchise history with Dak Prescott's 1-yard pass to CeeDee Lamb in the third quarter to take their first lead of the game, their first touchdown against the Patriots since 2011. During overtime, the Cowboys forced a Patriots punt, putting the Cowboys in position to score. During the final play, Dak Prescott threw a game-winning touchdown pass to CeeDee Lamb to seal the Cowboys' win. With the win the Cowboys improved to 5–1, as well as getting their first win over the Patriots since 1996, and their first on the road since 1987.

Week 8: at Minnesota Vikings

Dak Prescott was benched for the game due to a grade 1 calf strain. Backup Cooper Rush got his first career start in place of Prescott. The Cowboys' defense allowed an opening-drive touchdown and was not able to collect any takeaways, but they gave the Vikings' offense a hard time all game and only allowed three field goals the rest of the game. The Cowboys won the game in the final minute when Cooper Rush connected with Amari Cooper for a five-yard touchdown pass. With the win, the Cowboys improved to 6–1. This was the Cowboys' second consecutive win over the Vikings, as well as the third at U.S. Bank Stadium. This was the first time the Cowboys won six in a row since 2016.

Week 9: vs. Denver Broncos

The Cowboys returned home to face the Denver Broncos. Dallas entered the game as 10-point home favorites, seeking their first win against Denver since the 1995 season. However, the Cowboys' offense was stymied by the Broncos defense the entire game. The Cowboys recorded their second blocked punt of the season, but the Broncos recovered to retain possession. Dallas' only points came on two touchdowns to Malik Turner, but the outcome was already decided in favor of the Broncos. The 30-16 loss dropped the Cowboys to 6–2 on the season, and 0–7 in their last 7 matchups against the Broncos. Dallas never held a lead against Denver, and was held under twenty points, both firsts for the season.

Week 10: vs. Atlanta Falcons

The Cowboys rebounded in a considerable way. The Cowboys offense combined for 43 points off of 431 yards. The scoring began with CeeDee Lamb hauling in Dak Prescott's pass for a touchdown to give the Cowboys the early lead. The Falcons responded with a field goal for their lone scoring play of the game. Afterwards, the Cowboys put up 36 unanswered points, 29 of which came in the second quarter. Ezekiel Elliott scored two touchdown runs to extend Dallas' lead to 21-3, before Lamb caught his second touchdown to make it 28-3. The special teams would also contribute with Nahshon Wright returning a blocked punt for a touchdown. As the Cowboys led 36–3 at halftime, their defense intercepted the Falcons three times in as many drives. One of those interceptions was by Trevon Diggs, who had not intercepted a pass since Week 6 against the Patriots. With this win, the Cowboys improved to 7–2.

Week 11: at Kansas City Chiefs

Despite strong defensive play, the Cowboys offense could not keep pace with Patrick Mahomes and the Chiefs. The Cowboys noticed the absence of Amari Cooper, who was ruled out due to COVID-19 protocols. Cooper's absence would contribute largely to Dallas' subsequent struggles on offense, as they failed to score a single touchdown despite their defense holding Kansas City's high-powered offense under 20 points. The 19–9 loss dropped the Cowboys to 7–3. This was the Cowboys' only game of the season not scoring at least 10 points.

Week 12: vs. Las Vegas Raiders
Thanksgiving Day games

After their loss to the Chiefs, the Cowboys looked to win their first game on Thanksgiving since they beat the Washington Football Team in 2018, who were then known as the Redskins. The Cowboys were already in trouble after several pass interference plays. The Cowboys sent the game to overtime, but after a controversial pass interference call on Anthony Brown, they could not succeed at making a comeback. The Cowboys fell to 7–4, and lost their third consecutive game on Thanksgiving Day.

Week 13: at New Orleans Saints

With Mike McCarthy in COVID-19 protocols, Dan Quinn took the interim head coaching position in place of McCarthy. The Cowboys ended their losing streak against the Saints in New Orleans with the win, as well as improving to 8–4.

Week 14: at Washington Football Team

The Cowboys continued their road trip against the Washington Football Team. Dallas would jump out to a 24-0 lead by halftime. One of those scoring plays involved Micah Parsons forcing a fumble, which was recovered by Dorance Armstrong for a touchdown. In the second half, Washington would awaken from their slump and score three touchdowns of their own, including a pick-six by Cole Holcomb. However, Dallas was able to stave off the late rally and keep the game out of Washington's reach by forcing a game-ending fumble. The win improved the Cowboys to 9–4.

Week 15: at New York Giants

The Cowboys continued their dominance against the Giants. The Cowboys defense continued to be superior to the Giants offense, as the Cowboys held the Giants without a touchdown. The win improved the Cowboys to 10–4. Several days later, the Cowboys clinched a postseason berth after the 49ers lost to the Titans.

Week 16: vs. Washington Football Team

Having already clinched the NFC East after the Broncos lost to the Raiders, the Cowboys looked to add to their momentum as they returned home to play against the Washington Football Team. The Cowboys dominated the game in every way. Their defense continued to shine with an additional 2 takeaways, one of which was a pick six. Dak Prescott became the first quarterback in NFL history to throw at least one touchdown pass to a wide receiver, running back, offensive tackle, and a tight end, all in one game, with one touchdown pass going to running back Ezekiel Elliott, one touchdown pass going to wide receiver Amari Cooper, one touchdown pass going to offensive tackle Terence Steele, and one touchdown pass going to Dalton Schultz. The Cowboys scored their most points since 1980 when they romped the 49ers, 59–14. This win improved the Cowboys to 11–4 and swept Washington for the first time since 2019.

Week 17: vs. Arizona Cardinals

The Cowboys stayed home for the second straight week to take on the Arizona Cardinals. Dallas struggled in the first half and could not keep pace with Arizona. They later fought back in the fourth quarter to pull within 3 points, but a controversial fumble call ended the Cowboys' momentum. This loss dropped the Cowboys to 11–5 on the season.

Wide receiver Michael Gallup left the game with a knee injury in the second quarter after a touchdown reception. It was confirmed to be a torn ACL, ending his season.

Week 18: at Philadelphia Eagles

The Cowboys traveled to Philadelphia to play the backup-laden Eagles, who had also already clinched a playoff spot. Dak Prescott threw for 5 touchdowns, a career high. He also surpassed Tony Romo's single-season touchdown pass record. It was the first time in history the Cowboys would score 50+ points on the road. This was the first time since 1998 that the Cowboys completed a season sweep of the NFC East. The Cowboys finished the regular season 12–5 in the first ever 17-game NFL season.

Standings
Division

Conference

Postseason

Game summaries
NFC Wild Card Playoffs: vs. (6) San Francisco 49ers

The Cowboys hosted the San Francisco 49ers for the Wild Card Playoffs. However, the Cowboys were plagued by miscues and penalties throughout the game, and a late fourth-quarter rally fell short in a heartbreaking loss. San Francisco scored first with a touchdown run by Elijah Mitchell on the game's opening drive, and built their lead to 23–7 by the start of the fourth quarter. Dallas started their rally with a long field goal by Greg Zuerlein, followed by a touchdown run by Dak Prescott. On the game's final drive, Prescott led the Cowboys deep into San Francisco territory, but with seconds remaining and no time-outs, he was stopped in bounds on a run up the middle as the game clock continued running. The Cowboys had a first down at the 49ers 24-yard line, but the clock expired before Prescott could stop it by spiking the ball, ending the game and Dallas's season. The 23–17 loss marked the second time in their past three postseason appearances, and the seventh time in their past ten, that Dallas went one-and-done in the playoffs. The Cowboys finished the season with a total record of 12–6.

Statistics

Team

IndividualStatistics correct as of the end of the 2021 NFL season''

References

External links
 
 

Dallas
Dallas Cowboys seasons
NFC East championship seasons
Dallas Cowboys